In the Inuit religion, Ignirtoq is a god of light and truth.

Inuit gods
Light gods